The Hickory Crawdads are a Minor League Baseball team of the South Atlantic League (SAL) and the High-A affiliate of the Texas Rangers. They are located in Hickory, North Carolina, and play their home games at L. P. Frans Stadium, which opened in 1993 and has roughly 4,000 fixed seats.

Established in 1993 as members of the South Atlantic League, the Crawdads were affiliated with the Chicago White Sox through 1998. They became a farm club of the Pittsburgh Pirates in 1999 and won the South Atlantic League championship in 2002 and 2004. Hickory has been affiliated with the Texas Rangers since 2009. The Crawdads won a third SAL championship in 2015. They moved to the High-A East in 2021, but this was renamed the South Atlantic League in 2022.

History 
Several minor league baseball teams known as the Hickory Rebels played in Hickory, North Carolina, intermittently from 1936 to 1960. Local businessman Don Beaver purchased the Gastonia Rangers and relocated them from Gastonia, North Carolina, to Hickory for the 1993 season. Prior to the move, the Gastonia team had served as a minor league affiliate of both the Rangers and the Montreal Expos. 

Fans were invited to submit suggestions for the team's name. Among the finalists were "Woodchucks", "River Rats", "Valley Cats", and "Hound Dogs". The chosen name, "Crawdads", was selected because of the animals' strength and presence in local waterways.

The Crawdads played in the South Atlantic League as the Class A affiliate of the Chicago White Sox in their inaugural 1993 season. The six-year affiliation regularly saw Hickory at or near the bottom of the standings, though they did qualify for the playoffs twice. On both occasions, however, they were eliminated without winning any games. The affiliation ended after the 1998 season with team accumulating a 374–464 record over that period.

Hickory entered into a new affiliation with the Pittsburgh Pirates in 1999. The Crawdads reached the postseason in five of ten seasons with Pittsburgh. They won two South Atlantic League championships, the first in 2002 and the second in 2004. The affiliation ended after the 2008 season with Hickory going 705–677 over a span of 10 years.

The Crawdads became an affiliate of the Texas Rangers in 2009. Since then, they reached the SAL finals on two occasions and won the championship in 2015. Following the 2017 season, the Rangers purchased the team from Beaver.

In conjunction with Major League Baseball's restructuring of Minor League Baseball in 2021, the Crawdads were organized into the High-A East. In 2022, the High-A East became known as the South Atlantic League, the name historically used by the regional circuit prior to the 2021 reorganization.

Season-by-season results

Mascot
Conrad the Crawdad has been the official mascot of the Crawdads since 1993. Conrad, along with his wife Candy, entertain fans during games. The two got engaged on Mother's Day weekend in 2018 and were married in an on-field ceremony on June 24, 2018.

Roster

Awards 

Four players and two managers have won South Atlantic League awards in recognition for their performance with the Crawdads.

Notable alumni

 Jim Abbott
 Jorge Alfaro
 José Bautista
 Joe Beimel
 Matt Capps
 Joe Crede
 Rajai Davis
 Zach Duke
 Jerad Eickhoff
 Joey Gallo
 John Grabow
 Odubel Herrera
Luke Jackson 
 Carlos Lee
 Nomar Mazara
 Andrew McCutchen
 Nate McLouth
 Nyjer Morgan
 Rougned Odor
 Magglio Ordóñez
 Steve Pearce
 Martín Pérez
 Jurickson Profar
 Aaron Rowand
 Neil Walker
 Chris Young

References

External links

 Official website
 Statistics from Baseball-Reference

1993 establishments in North Carolina
Baseball teams established in 1993
Chicago White Sox minor league affiliates
South Atlantic League teams
Hickory, North Carolina
Pittsburgh Pirates minor league affiliates
Professional baseball teams in North Carolina
Texas Rangers minor league affiliates
High-A East teams